is a municipal zoo  in Chūō-ku, Sapporo, Hokkaido, Japan. It opened on May 5, 1951.

The zoo is located within Maruyama Park in western Sapporo, and is the oldest zoo in Hokkaido.

History
Sapporo Maruyama Zoo officially opened in 1951 with its origin stemming from hosting a travelling zoo for the "Ueno Zoo". While hosting the travelling zoo, it received such a overwhelmingly good response from the residence that the City of Sapporo decided to open a zoo itself. The theme and the overarching philosophy of the Maruyama Zoo was to create habitats that mimic the natural environments that the animals originate from. Therefore, the exhibits host a variety of different habitats for various different animals with themes that correspond to their natural habitat. Throughout the decades the Zoo has opened new exhibits, notably the Wakuwaku Asia Zone that opened in 2012, and the Polar Bear Pavilion that opened in 2018; with the Polar bear Pavilion being the largest polar bear exhibit in Japan.

Incidents
Starting in 2010, the zoo tried for four years to mate two hyenas until they discovered they were both males.

Access
The zoo is approximately 15 minutes' walk from Maruyama-Kōen Station on the Tōzai Line.

Attractions and Animals
Sapporo Maruyama Zoo covers an area of 22.5 ha, and is home to 168 different species and 737 animals.

See also
  Japanese Association of Zoos and Aquariums (JAZA)
  Maruyama Park

References

External links

  
 Maruyama Zoo Channel 

Tourist attractions in Sapporo
Zoos in Japan
Buildings and structures in Sapporo
1951 establishments in Japan
Zoos established in 1951